John T. McCall (August 25, 1863 – February 13, 1950) was an American politician from New York.

Life
He was born on August 25, 1863, in New York City.

He was an Alderman of New York City from 1898 to 1906; and in May 1903 was elected Chairman of the Committee on Finance.

McCall was a member of the New York State Senate (16th D.) in 1907 and 1908. In 1908, he was denied a re-nomination by Tammany Hall, and Assemblyman Robert F. Wagner was nominated for the seat instead.

McCall was again a member of the State Senate (18th D.) from 1931 to 1940, sitting in the 154th, 155th, 156th, 157th, 158th, 159th, 160th, 161st and 162nd New York State Legislatures.

He was a delegate to the New York State Constitutional Convention of 1938; and an alternate delegate to the 1940 Democratic National Convention.

He died on February 13, 1950.

Sources

1863 births
1950 deaths
Democratic Party New York (state) state senators
People from New York City
New York City Council members